Inlaks & Budhrani Hospital is a hospital in Pune, Maharashtra, India.

Inlaks & Budhrani Hospital was commissioned in the year 1989. the hospital was inaugurated on 9 January 1989 by Mother Teresa.

References

Hospital buildings completed in 1989
Hospitals in Pune
1989 establishments in Maharashtra
20th-century architecture in India